Romania is one of the world's largest wine producers and fifth-largest among European wine-producing countries, after Italy, France, Spain, and Germany. Similar in size to wine-producing countries such as Chile and Portugal but lesser-known on the world wine stage. In 2018 it produced around 5.2 million hectolitres of wine. In recent years, Romania has attracted many European business people and wine buyers, due to the affordable prices of both vineyards and wines compared to other wine-producing nations such as France, Germany, and Italy.

Romania's most cultivated grape varieties are for white wines Fetească Albă, Fetească Regală, Riesling, Aligoté, Sauvignon, Muscat, Pinot Gris, Chardonnay, Tămâioasă Românească, Grasă de Cotnari, Galbenă de Odobești. Also, the main grape varieties for red wines are Merlot, Cabernet Sauvignon, Băbească Neagră, Fetească Neagră, Pinot Noir.

History

Romania has one of the oldest wine-making traditions in the world and its viticulture dates back more than 6,000 years. Due to suitable climate, relief and soils, viticulture became a current activity of the local inhabitants mainly in the hilly areas. Numerous local wine grape varieties have been obtained during medieval time by empirical selection, becoming representatives for Romanian wine regions. Up to the phylloxera crisis, each Romanian wine region had its own wine grape assortment, that generated specific local wines. Since the medieval period, wine has been the traditional alcoholic beverage of the Romanians.

In the 1880s phylloxera (a pale yellow sap-sucking insect that attacks the roots of vines) was introduced accidentally also in Romania (1872, Chitorani, Dealul Mare wine-growing region), and over a period of several years destroyed the local viticulture. Restoration of the Romanian viticulture lasted until the beginning of the 20th century, and was done mainly by planting French wine grape varieties such as Merlot, Chardonnay, Pinot noir, Sauvignon, Cabernet Sauvignon etc. Besides these, phylloxera-resistant grape hybrids were also planted. Several traditional Romanian wine grapes did survive the phylloxera crisis, and are still cultivated in Romania in the 21st Century.

Romania has about 187,000 hectares of vine plantations; that ranks it on sixth place between the European wine-producing countries. With a wine production of about 4.5 million hl/year, Romania is the thirteenth largest wine-producing country in the world.

Wine-producing regions
Main wine regions of Romania are:

The Transylvanian Plateau region (Podișul Transilvaniei)
Târnave
Alba
Aiud
Sebeș-Apold
Lechința
The Moldovan Hills region (Dealurile Moldovei)
Cotnari 
Iași
Huși
Zeletin
Colinele Tutovei
Dealul Bujorului 
Iveşti 
Nicoreşti
Covurlui
Panciu
Odobești 
Cotești
The Munteniei & Olteniei Hills region (Dealurile Munteniei și Olteniei)
Dealurile Buzăului
Dealu Mare
Ștefănești
Sâmburești
Drăgășani
Dealurile Craiovei
Podgoria Severinului
Plaiurile Drâncei
The Banat Hills region (Dealurile Banatului)
Moldova Nouă 
Recaș 
Silagiu
Teremia
Tirol
The Crișana Hills region (Dealurile Crișanei) and the Maramureș region (Maramureșului)
Miniș-Măderat
Diosig 
Șimleu Silvaniei
Valea lui Mihai
The Dobruja Hills region (Colinele Dobrogei)
Sarica-Niculițel
Istria-Babadag
Murfatlar
The Danube Terraces region (Terasele Dunării)
Greaca
Ostrov
Additional favorable sandy regions in central-southern Romania (Regiunea nisipurilor și altor terenuri favorabile din sudul țării)
Sadova-Corabia
Calafat
Podgoria Dacilor (in Mehedinți County, Oltenia)

Wines
The wine grape assortments of Romanian wine-growing regions encompasses many varieties for white, red and aromatic wines. Each wine-growing region has its own traditional grape varieties: Zghihara de Husi and Busuioaca de Bohotin for the Huși wine-growing region; Fetească neagră for the Iași wine-growing region; Grasa de Cotnari and Frâncușa for the Cotnari wine-growing region; Crâmpoșie for the Drăgășani wine-growing region; Băbeasca Neagră for the Nicorești wine-growing region; Iordană și Ardeleancă for the Târnave wine-growing region; or Mustoasă de Măderat for the Miniș wine-growing region.

Each wine-growing region additionally cultivates international wine grape varieties, mainly: Sauvignon, Chardonnay, Riesling italico, Pinot gris and Traminer for white wines; and Cabernet Sauvignon, Merlot and Pinot noir for red wines. All these local and international varieties form the basis of many wines, presented mainly under the name of the wine grape variety (e.g. Sauvignon, Feteasca albă, Tămâioasă românească) and less commonly under the name of producer (e.g. DAVINO, ALIRA, LACERTA) or under a marketing name (e.g. Serafim, Bon Viveur, Gramma, René Faure etc.).

Traditional Whites 
The most known Romanian wine grape varieties for white wines are Fetească albă, Crâmpoșie and Fetească regală. Feteasca albă and Fetească regală produce dry or semi-dry wines, with rich floral aromas.  They have a moderate alcohol content (11.5 to 12%) and moderate acidity.  Crâmpoșia is known for producing fresh and fruity wines, with moderate alcohol content and pronounced acidity.

Traditional Reds
The most known Romanian wine grape variety for red wines is Fetească neagră, originating in the Uricani, Iași wine region. It produces ″dry, demi-dry or sweet wines, with an alcohol content of 12-14%, a deep red colour with ruby shades, and a black currant flavour, which becomes richer and smoother with ageing″.

Traditional Aromatics
Among the Romanian aromatic wine grape varieties, the most appreciated and cultivated are Tămâioasă Românească and Busuioacă de Bohotin.

Wineries

See also

Cuisine of Romania
Old World wine

References

External links 
 Recommended wines and wineries
 Romanian terroir and wine grape assortments